This is a list of films produced in Malaysia ordered by year of release in the 2010s.

For an alphabetical listing of Malaysian films see :Category:Malaysian films.

2010
 List of Malaysian films of 2010

2011
 List of Malaysian films of 2011

2012
 List of Malaysian films of 2012

2013
 List of Malaysian films of 2013

2014
 List of Malaysian films of 2014

2015
 List of Malaysian films of 2015

2016
 List of Malaysian films of 2016

2017
 List of Malaysian films of 2017

2018
 List of Malaysian films of 2018

2019
 List of Malaysian films of 2019

References

External links
Malaysian film at the Internet Movie Database
Malaysian Feature Films Finas
Cinema Online Malaysia

2010s
Lists of 2010s films
Films